Northwest Arkansas National Airport  is in Northwest Arkansas in Highfill, Arkansas, United States,  northwest of Fayetteville and  northwest of Springdale.  It is often referred to by its IATA code, which is incorporated in the airport's logo as "Fly XNA".

It sees year-round, daily nonstop jets to major cities such as Atlanta, Charlotte, Chicago, Denver, Houston, Dallas/Fort Worth, Los Angeles, Miami, Minneapolis/St. Paul, New York City, and Washington D.C. Much of its business is attributable to the presence of the world's largest company by revenue, Walmart, in nearby Bentonville. It is also frequently used by athletic teams at the University of Arkansas traveling to away games and Razorback opponents visiting Fayetteville. 

Federal Aviation Administration records say the airport had 547,871 passenger boardings (enplanements) in calendar year 2008, 530,087 in 2009 and 549,195 in 2010. It is included in the Federal Aviation Administration (FAA) National Plan of Integrated Airport Systems for 2019–2023, in which it is categorized as a small-hub primary commercial service facility.

History
XNA opened in November 1998. It replaced Fayetteville's Drake Field as the region's main airport with scheduled airline passenger flights. By the early 1990s, Drake Field had become too small to accommodate the growing traffic that the expanding region was generating.

Expansion
In 2007, airport officials announced the construction of a new concourse costing between $20 million and $25 million.  The new facility, east of the upper concourse, has allowed the airport to increase its number of airplane parking positions from twelve to twenty. Building the new facility took over three years.

The airport completed a ticket counter expansion in 2010. The airport has completed a $21 million expansion to the upper-level concourse that includes the state's first moving walkway. With the walkway, it is anticipated to take about three minutes to get from security to the last gate. The addition adds  and twelve upper-level gates to the east side of the airport.

The airport was previously known as Northwest Arkansas Regional Airport. It adopted the name Northwest Arkansas National Airport in December 2019. Airport officials attributed the change to perception, saying that the new name would help attract more airline service.
 
On September 23, 2021, it was announced that Board members took the first steps toward adding a new, second concourse. The board voted to have staff negotiate with Fentress Architects for conceptual drawings for the first phase of Concourse B. The design work will cost about $185,000.The new concourse would allow the airport to use its boarding gates more efficiently. The Board are contemplating bringing some gates on Concourse A back into use for certain aircraft sizes and redesigning others. Phase One would include an elevated walkway, a hold room for passengers and a covered walkway out to a ground-level loading area onto the aircraft. Construction of the project is estimated to cost roughly $35 million to $50 million. Longer range plans call for building out Concourse B to roughly match Concourse A.

Runway
The original runway built in 1998 required complete reconstruction in 2011, following the discovery of alkali-silica reaction (ASR) in its Portland cement concrete. Since the runway was the only one at the airport, a temporary runway was necessary to maintain service during reconstruction. Stimulus funds of $9 million ($ million in today's dollars) from the American Reinvestment and Recovery Act (ARRA) allowed XNA to accelerate the alternative runway construction project. Upon completion of the alternate runway in 2012, all aircraft operations were shifted to the new surface and demolition and replacement of the primary runway began.

Access Road
A proposed access road connecting the airport with the new Springdale Bypass (US-412) was part of a ½ cent statewide sales tax continuation amendment. This was passed by voters on November 3, 2020. As of February 10, 2021, three alternatives were brought to public comment with a live meeting scheduled March 2, 2021.

Facilities

The airport covers 2,184 acres (884 ha) at an elevation of 1,287 feet (392 m). It has two runways, 16/34 and 17/35. 16/34 is 8,801 feet long by 150 feet (2,683 x 46 m) wide and 17/35 is 8,800 feet long by 150 feet (2,682 x 46 m) wide.

In the year ending May 31, 2021, the airport had 28,440 aircraft operations, average 78 per day: 45% airline, 9% air taxi, 30% military, and 15% general aviation. In May 2021, eight aircraft were based at the airport:  one single-engine, three multi-engine, and four jet.

Airlines and destinations

Passenger

Statistics

Top destinations

Annual traffic

See also

 List of airports in Arkansas

References

External links
 
 
 Northwest Arkansas Regional (XNA) at the Arkansas Department of Aeronautics
 Aerial image from USGS The National Map
 
 

Airports in Arkansas
Transportation in Benton County, Arkansas
Buildings and structures in Benton County, Arkansas
Bentonville, Arkansas
Fayetteville, Arkansas
Rogers, Arkansas
Springdale, Arkansas